Beaufort may refer to:

People and titles
 Beaufort (surname)
 House of Beaufort, English nobility
 Duke of Beaufort (England), a title in the peerage of England
 Duke of Beaufort (France), a title in the French nobility

Places

Polar regions
 Beaufort Sea in the Arctic Ocean
 Beaufort Island, an island in Antarctica's Ross Sea

Australia
Beaufort, Queensland, a locality in the Barcaldine Region, Queensland
Beaufort, South Australia
 Beaufort, Victoria
 Beaufort Inlet, an inlet located in the Great Southern region of Western Australia

Canada
 Beaufort Range, Vancouver Island, British Columbia

France
 Beaufort, Haute-Garonne
 Beaufort, Hérault
 Beaufort, Isère
 Beaufort, Jura
 Beaufort, Nord
 Beaufort, Savoie
 Beaufort-Blavincourt, Pas-de-Calais 
 Beaufort-en-Argonne, Meuse 
 Beaufort-en-Santerre, Somme 
 Beaufort-en-Vallée, Maine-et-Loire 
 Beaufort-sur-Gervanne, Drôme
 Montmorency-Beaufort, Aube

Ireland
 Beaufort, County Kerry

Luxembourg
 Beaufort, Luxembourg

Lebanon
 Beaufort Castle, Lebanon

Malaysia
 Beaufort, Malaysia
 Beaufort (federal constituency)

South Africa
 Beaufort West, largest town in the arid Great Karoo
 Fort Beaufort, town in the Amatole District of Eastern Cape Province
 Port Beaufort, settlement in Eden in the Western Cape province

United Kingdom
 Beaufort, Blaenau Gwent, Wales
 Beaufort Castle, Scotland
 Beaufort's Dyke, between Scotland and Northern Ireland

United States
 Beaufort, North Carolina
 Beaufort County, North Carolina
 Beaufort, South Carolina
 Beaufort County, South Carolina

Military uses
 Bristol Beaufort, a large British torpedo bomber
 CSS Beaufort, a Confederate Navy gunboat
 Beaufort, a transport which served as headquarters for the Governor of Nova Scotia, Edward Cornwallis, for some Nova Scotia Council meetings

Transportation
 Beaufort (automobiles), a German manufacturer of automobiles solely for the British market from 1902 to 1910
 Beaufort (dinghy), a sailing dinghy designed by Ian Proctor
 Beaufort, one of the GWR 3031 Class locomotives that were built for and run on the Great Western Railway between 1891 and 1915, formerly named Bellerophon before 1895

Other uses
 Beaufort (film), a 2007 Israeli Oscar-nominated film, referring to Beaufort Castle, Lebanon
 Beaufort (novel), title of the 2007 English-language translation of the novel אם יש גן עדן (trsl. Im Yesh Gan Eden), basis for the film
 Beaufort Castle (disambiguation)
 Beaufort cheese, a French cheese
 Beaufort cipher, an encryption technique using a substitution cipher
 Beaufort County Schools (disambiguation)
 Beaufort Group, subdivisions of the Karoo Supergroup
 Beaufort War Hospital, Bristol, England
 Beaufort scale, an empirical measure for describing wind intensity